I Say I Say I Say is the sixth studio album from synthpop duo Erasure, released in 1994 by Mute Records in the UK and Elektra Records in the US. The album was produced by Martyn Ware, who was a founding member of veteran synthpop groups the Human League and Heaven 17.

Upon its release it became Erasure's fourth consecutive studio album to hit No. 1 in the UK, and fifth overall, generating three top-20 singles. In the US, I Say I Say I Say debuted and peaked at number 18 on the Billboard 200, easily beating their previous highest chart placing. In Germany, the album climbed to number six.

Although Erasure always maintained popularity in the US dance club community, with the rise of grunge rock Erasure saw their exposure on college radio, mainstream stations and MTV become mostly non-existent by 1994. This made it even more of a surprise when the ballad "Always" gave them their third top-20 hit on the Billboard Hot 100 in September.

The album saw keyboardist/programmer Vince Clarke continue with his by-then trademark exclusive usage of pre-MIDI analog synthesizers and sequencers, with the additional self-imposed constraint that no drum machines were to be used either. Instead, Clarke used synthesizers to create the album's drum and percussion sounds.

Track listing

On the Chilean/Argentinian cassette version, there's a Spanish rendition of "Always" (Spanish vocal), just before "Always".

In the Philippines release of this album in MC, 2 extended remixes of "Always" were added as hidden tracks (no mention or credits in the inlay), one at the start of each side (before "Take Me Back" on Side 1 and the original "Always" on Side 2).

2016 "Erasure 30" 30th anniversary BMG reissue LP
Subsequent to their acquisition of Erasure's back catalog, and in anticipation of the band's 30th anniversary, BMG commissioned reissues of all previously released UK editions of Erasure albums up to and including 2007's Light at the End of the World. All titles were pressed and distributed by Play It Again Sam on 180-gram vinyl and shrinkwrapped with a custom anniversary sticker.

Personnel
Andy Bell – vocals
Vince Clarke – synthesizers, programming
 Sy-Jenq Cheng – design
 Mike Cosford – paintings
 John Dexter – arranger, conductor
 Luke Gifford – assistant engineer
 Norman Hathaway – design
 Andy Houston – engineer
 Rob Kirwan – assistant engineer
 Phil Legg – engineer, mixing
 Kevin Metcalfe – editing
 St. Patrick's Cathedral Choir – choir, chorus
 Al Stone – engineer
 Martyn Ware – producer
 Olaf Wendt – artwork

Charts

Weekly charts

Year-end charts

Certifications

References

Erasure albums
1994 albums
Mute Records albums
Elektra Records albums